Kollengode railway station (code: KLGD) is a railway station in Palakkad district, Kerala and falls under the Palakkad railway division of the Southern Railway zone, Indian Railways.

Palakkad–Pollachi line
Railway stations in Palakkad district
Railway stations opened in 1904
Palakkad railway division